The Maramataha River is a river in the Manawatū-Whanganui region of New Zealand. The river rises west of Lake Taupo and flows generally west to become a tributary of the Ongarue River.

See also
List of rivers of New Zealand

References

Rivers of Manawatū-Whanganui
Rivers of New Zealand